A Liebesfuss (Liebesfuß, love foot, French pavillon d'amour) is a pear- or bulb-shaped element that narrows to a small opening in double reed instruments such as the oboe d'amore, cor anglais and Heckelphon. It serves as a damper that gives these musical instruments a characteristically soft timbre. It is the eponymous characteristic of the oboe d'amore, which was developed in the baroque alongside other particularly sweet-sounding instruments such as the viola d'amore and the clarinet d'amore, which originated around 1740, died out in the mid-19th century, and was redeveloped from 2017 to 2020 on the basis of a basset clarinet in G.

A slightly larger and 90-degree angled love foot, which can be rotated both forwards and backwards, can be found on historical basset clarinets, as well as on a modern basset clarinet that adopts this detail from a historical clarinet, as Charles Neidich did.

References

Oboes
clarinets